Wilhelmus Gerardus Stephanus Maria "Wim" van der Leegte (born August 1947) is a Dutch billionaire, and runs the Netherlands-based VDL Groep.

Career
VDL Groep, one of Europe's largest privately held car and bus makers, was founded in 1953 by his father Pieter van der Leegte, when it started making parts for trucking companies.

In January 2016 VDL announced that van der Leegte would be step down in November, after 50 years as president.

Personal life
Van der Leegte is married with three children and lives in Eindhoven, Netherlands. His three children: Pieter, Jennifer and Willem, are all members of the executive board, and own shares in the company.

References

1947 births
Living people
Dutch billionaires
Dutch businesspeople
People from Eindhoven